Sheepy is a civil parish in the Borough of Hinckley and Bosworth in Leicestershire, England.  It contains the villages of Sheepy Magna, Sheepy Parva, Sibson, Wellsborough, Upton, Pinwall and Cross Hands—collectively 449 homes.  At the 2001 census, the parish had a population of 1,192, including Orton on the Hill but falling slightly to 1,174 at the 2011 census.

The parish was created in 1935 from the merger of the four civil parishes of Sheepy Magna, Sheepy Parva, Sibson and Upton.

During the English Civil War, Sheepy provided free quarter and horses to troops from the parliamentary garrisons from north Warwickshire. In June 1646, Gregory Kent, the parish clerk, submitted a claim for losses to the Warwickshire County Committee, including claims for free quarter for about a hundred horses and men under the command of Captain Flower and Captain Ottway of the Coventry garrison. Mr Burbidge,  and Captain Turton were charged with taking a mare worth £6.13.4. The offender was probably Richard Burbidge, garrison quartermaster at Edgbaston Hall under Colonel Tinker Fox. At the siege of Tamworth, soldiers under the command of Captain Castleton apparently made off with valuable horses belonging to Thomas Owen, John Thurman, John Vincent, John Toon and Mr Kent, the town clerk. 

The village of Sheepy has one public house The Black Horse whilst Sibson has The Cock Inn (currently closed) and Millers Hotel, Sheepy Parva is home to an Italian restaurant called San Giovanni's whilst Upton has Upton Barn Caravaning, Camping and Fishing and Leicestershire Cheese Company. Pinwall Feeds supplies the area with farm and pet foods, Christmas trees and other useful items. Sheepy is also home to InSilver Jewellers and Parkys farm milkshakes barn. Mythe Barn is also within the parish offering a wonderful Wedding and events venue.

There are many groups running in the community including Cubs, Scouts , Beavers, Rainbows, Brownies, Inspirations Choir , School PTA, Mother's Union, WI, Local History, Fruit and Vegetable Society , Playing field committee  and Sheepy Bonfire Society NHW.

The Memorial Hall is charity run and Thomas Leaving Charity provides two houses on Twitchell Lane.

References

John Nichols, History and Antiquities of Leicestershire, Vol. IV.
Sheepy, A Tale of Two Sheep, Vol. XVI.

Civil parishes in Leicestershire
Hinckley and Bosworth